is a railway station on the Hankyu Senri Line in Higashiyodogawa-ku, Osaka, Japan.

Layout
The station has two side platforms serving a track each connecting with a footbridge. Ticket gate is located on the side platform for Tengachaya.

History
The station opened on October 15, 1925 when the line between Tenjinbashi (present-day ) and  opened.

Future plans 
Construction is underway for grade separation. Work is being done as of 2019 to elevate a  section of the Senri Line between this station and Shimo-Shinjō Station. Originally planned to be opened by 2020, various delays have resulted in the opening being pushed to 2031.

Surroundings
Kunijima Purification Plant (Osaka City Waterworks Bureau)
Kunijima Castle
Kunijima Shrine
Osaka Prefectural Kunijima High School
Osaka Municipal Kunijima Junior High School
Sozenji Station (Kyoto Line)
Higashiyodogawa Kunijima Post Office

Stations next to Kunijima

References

External links
 Kunjima Station from Hankyu Railway website

Railway stations in Japan opened in 1925
Railway stations in Osaka
Higashiyodogawa-ku, Osaka